Philip Desmond "Chic" Bates (born 28 November 1949) is an English former football player and manager.

Bates played non-league football with Stourbridge before becoming a professional with Shrewsbury Town in 1974. He had a fine debut season scoring 17 goals as the "Shrews" gained promotion to the Third Division. He continued to perform well and in 1977 he joined Swindon Town where he spent two years before joining Bristol Rovers. After a year at Rovers he re-joined Shrewsbury Town and in 1984 he became player manager.

He left in 1987 to become assistant manager to Lou Macari at Swindon Town and followed Macari to Stoke City and Celtic and back to Stoke. After Macari left Stoke in May 1997 Bates was appointed as manager and despite a decent start Stoke's form fell away and with the side destined for relegation he was sacked in January 1998. He returned to Shrewsbury and had two spells as caretaker manager.

Playing career
Bates was born in West Bromwich began his career with non-league Stourbridge before joining Shrewsbury Town in 1974. He became a useful forward for the "Shrews" and in his first season as a professional he scored 17 goals helping the team gain promotion. He continued to impress for Shrewsbury and caught the eye of a number of larger clubs and eventually left for Swindon Town in 1978. He spent two years at Swindon and had a short spell at Bristol Rovers before returning to Shrewsbury Town where became player manager.

Managerial career
Bates was appointed player manager of Shrewsbury Town in 1984 and retired from playing in 1985 taking up full-time management a position he would keep until November 1987. He again left Shrewsbury for Swindon Town becoming assistant manager to Lou Macari and Osvaldo Ardiles. When Macari was appointed manager of Stoke City in 1991 he appointed Bates as his assistant and the pair worked together at Stoke until October 1993 when they joined Celtic. A year later they returned to Stoke and after Macari left again in May 1997 Bates was surprisingly given the vacancy in the club's first season at the Britannia Stadium.

Whilst Bates was a useful and popular coach he was not thought to be a successful manager. Regardless to Bates' credit Stoke made a steady start to the 1997–98 season and by the end of October Stoke were in a play-off position. But results started to go wrong which hit rock bottom in January 1998 with a 7–0 defeat at home to Birmingham City. The result prompted ugly scenes at the final whistle as around 2,000 fans invaded the pitch and entered the directors box. Bates was sacked a week later. He moved back to Shrewsbury and became assistant manager filling in as caretaker on two occasions firstly in November 1999 and 22 October 2004 to 15 November 2004.

Dementia

In 2013 Bates was diagnosed with frontotemporal dementia and Alzheimers.

Career statistics

Managerial statistics

References

External links
 
 

Living people
Stoke City F.C. managers
Shrewsbury Town F.C. managers
English Football League managers
1949 births
Stourbridge F.C. players
Shrewsbury Town F.C. players
Swindon Town F.C. players
Bristol Rovers F.C. players
English Football League players
English footballers
Swindon Town F.C. non-playing staff
Celtic F.C. non-playing staff
Association football forwards
English football managers